This is a list of commercial banks in Togo.

List
 Financial Bank Togo
 Banque Sahélo-Saharienne pour l'Investissement et le Commerce
 Banque Atlantique Togo
 Banque Régionale de Solidarité
 Banque Togilaise pour le Commerce et l'Industrie
 Banque Internationale pour l'Afrique au Togo
 Ecobank Togo	
 Société Inter-Africaine de Banque	
 Union Togolaise de Banque	
 Banque Togolaise de Développement

See also
 List of banks in Africa
 Central Bank of West African States
 Economy of Togo
 List of companies based in Togo

References

External links
 Website of Central Bank of West African States

Togo
Banks
Togo